Auckland is one of the sixteen regions of New Zealand, which takes its name from the eponymous urban area. The region encompasses the Auckland Metropolitan Area, smaller towns, rural areas, and the islands of the Hauraki Gulf. Containing  percent of the nation's residents, it has by far the largest population and economy of any region of New Zealand, but the second-smallest land area.

On 1 November 2010, the Auckland region became a unitary authority administered by the Auckland Council, replacing the previous regional council and seven local councils. In the process, an area in its southeastern corner was transferred to the neighbouring Waikato region.

Geography 

On the mainland, the region extends from the mouth of the Kaipara Harbour in the north across the southern stretches of the Northland Peninsula, through the Waitākere Ranges and the isthmus of Auckland and across the low-lying land surrounding the Manukau Harbour, ending within a few kilometres of the mouth of the Waikato River. It also includes the islands of the Hauraki Gulf. It is bordered in the north by the Northland Region, and in the south by the Waikato region. The Hunua Ranges and the adjacent coastline along the Firth of Thames were part of the region until the Auckland Council was formed in late 2010, when they were transferred to the Waikato region. In land area the region is smaller than all the other regions and unitary authorities except Nelson.

Its highest point is the summit of Little Barrier Island, at 722 metres.

Demographics 

Auckland Region had a population of 1,571,718 at the 2018 New Zealand census, an increase of 156,168 people (11.0%) since the 2013 census, and an increase of 266,760 people (20.4%) since the 2006 census. There were 496,458 households. There were 776,979 males and 794,742 females, giving a sex ratio of 0.98 males per female. The median age was 34.7 years (compared with 37.4 years nationally), with 313,839 people (20.0%) aged under 15 years, 357,522 (22.7%) aged 15 to 29, 711,186 (45.2%) aged 30 to 64, and 189,177 (12.0%) aged 65 or older.

Ethnicities were 53.5% European/Pākehā, 11.5% Māori, 15.5% Pacific peoples, 28.2% Asian, and 3.3% other ethnicities (totals add to more than 100% since people could identify with multiple ethnicities).

English is the most spoken language (92.8%) followed by Samoan (4.4%), Mandarin (4.4%), Hindi (3.0%) and Te Reo Māori (2.4%). Percentages add up to more than 100% as people may select more than one language.

The proportion of people born overseas was 41.0%, compared with 27.1% nationally.

Although some people objected to giving their religion, 42.6% had no religion, 38.4% were Christian, 5.2% were Hindu, 2.6% were Muslim, 1.9% were Buddhist and 3.9% had other religions.

Of those at least 15 years old, 360,954 (28.7%) people had a bachelor or higher degree, and 168,276 (13.4%) people had no formal qualifications. The median income was $34,400, compared with $31,800 nationally. 248,613 people (19.8%) earned over $70,000 compared to 17.2% nationally. The employment status of those at least 15 was that 652,797 (51.9%) people were employed full-time, 171,738 (13.7%) were part-time, and 51,561 (4.1%) were unemployed.

Towns and cities 

Other urban areas in the Auckland region include:

 Hibiscus Coast
 Pukekohe
 Waiuku
 Waiheke West
 Beachlands-Pine Harbour
 Warkworth
 Kumeū-Huapai
 Snells Beach
 Riverhead
 Helensville
 Maraetai
 Wellsford
 Clarks Beach
 Waimauku
 Muriwai
 Patumahoe
 Parakai

See also 
 Auckland § Scope
 Auckland Province

References

External links